Jamie-Lea Winch (born 18 October 1990) is an English international lawn bowler.

Bowls career
Jamie competed for England in the women's pairs at the 2014 Commonwealth Games where she won a silver medal with Natalie Melmore.

In 2015 she won the triples silver medal and fours bronze medal at the Atlantic Bowls Championships and in 2016, she was part of the fours team with Rebecca Wigfield, Wendy King and Ellen Falkner who won the silver medal at the 2016 World Outdoor Bowls Championship in Christchurch.

She has won four National Championships including the singles in 2019. Also during 2019 she won the triples gold medal at the Atlantic Bowls Championships.

In 2022, she competed in the women's triples and the Women's fours at the 2022 Commonwealth Games. She won the gold medal in the triples with Sian Honnor and Natalie Chestney.

References

1990 births
Living people
Bowls players at the 2010 Commonwealth Games
Bowls players at the 2014 Commonwealth Games
Bowls players at the 2022 Commonwealth Games
Commonwealth Games silver medallists for England
Commonwealth Games bronze medallists for England
English female bowls players
Sportspeople from Northampton
Commonwealth Games medallists in lawn bowls
Bowls European Champions
Medallists at the 2010 Commonwealth Games
Medallists at the 2014 Commonwealth Games
Medallists at the 2022 Commonwealth Games